Edda Villaluna Henson is a socialite and member of the Villaluna Family, said to be the Mining Royal Family in the Philippines. In 1990 she was appointed as the fourth Administrator of Intramuros by President Corazon Aquino, but was dismissed five years later on November 30, 1995 by President Fidel Ramos over corruption scandals, including anomalies in bidding for government projects.

References

Living people
University of Santo Tomas alumni
Year of birth missing (living people)